Al-Haaj Muhammad Ilyas Chinioti is a Pakistani politician who has been a Member of the Provincial Assembly of the Punjab, from 2008 to May 2018 and from August 2018 till January 2023.

Early life and education
He was born on 31 December 1961 in Chiniot.

He graduated from Bahauddin Zakariya University in 2002 and has the degree of Bachelor of Arts and a degree of the Master of Arts in Arabic. He received the degree of Master of Arts in Islamiat from University of the Punjab in 2008.

Political career
He was elected to the Provincial Assembly of the Punjab as a candidate of Pakistan Muslim League (N) (PML-N) from Constituency PP-73 (Jhang-I) in 2008 Pakistani general election.

He was re-elected to the Provincial Assembly of the Punjab as a candidate of PML-N from Constituency PP-73 (Jhang-I) in 2013 Pakistani general election.

He was re-elected to Provincial Assembly of the Punjab as a candidate of PML-N from Constituency PP-94 (Chiniot-II) in 2018 Pakistani general election.

References 

Living people
1961 births
Bahauddin Zakariya University alumni
People from Chiniot District
Pakistan Muslim League (N) MPAs (Punjab)
Punjabi people
Punjab MPAs 2008–2013
Punjab MPAs 2013–2018
Punjab MPAs 2018–2023